Bhuwan Karki (also spelled as Bhuvan Karki or Bhuban Karki) (born 28 January 1994) is a Nepalese cricketer. He is a left-handed batsman and a left-arm orthodox spinner. He made his debut for Nepal against Kuwait in October 2012.

He has also represented Nepal national under-19 cricket team in the 2011 ACC Under-19 Elite Cup, 2011 ICC Under-19 World Cup Qualifier, 2012 ACC Under-19 Asia Cup, 2012 ICC Under-19 World Cup, 2013 ACC Under-19 Elite Cup, 2013/14 ACC Under-19 Asia Cup and several other tournaments.

He represents the Panchakanya Tej of the Nepal Premier League, APF Club of the National League and Sudur Pashchimanchal Academy, which plays in the SPA Cup.

Playing career 

He won the man of the series award in the 2014 Nepal Premier League by taking 14 wickets in the tournament. Then he was selected in Nepal's squad for the 2014 Asian Games, where he picked of 2 wickets against Maldives.

He was also selected for the 2014 ICC World Cricket League Division Three. He and picked up seven wickets in just the two matches he played, including four wickets in the final match against Uganda, which helped Nepal win the tournament.

He made List A debut against Kenya in the 2015 ICC World Cricket League Division Two in Namibia in January 2015.

He made his Twenty20 International (T20I) debut for Nepal, against Thailand, on 4 March 2020.

References 

1994 births
Living people
Nepalese cricketers
People from Kailali District
Cricketers at the 2014 Asian Games
Asian Games competitors for Nepal
Nepal Twenty20 International cricketers